The 2022 bet365 North American Championship was the fourth edition of the tournament organized by the Professional Darts Corporation for North American players. The tournament took place at the Hulu Theater, New York City, United States on 4 June 2022, and featured the 8 players from the North American side of players that had qualified for the 2022 US Darts Masters, competing in a knockout system, with the winner earning a place in the 2023 PDC World Darts Championship and the 2022 Grand Slam of Darts.

Format
The format of the tournament was the same as before, using a leg format, with all the matches being the best of 11 legs (or first to 6 legs).

Prize money
The total prize fund was US$25,000. The winner of the tournament got a spot in the 2023 PDC World Darts Championship and the 2022 Grand Slam of Darts.

Qualifiers
The eight qualifiers for the tournament were the 8 players from the North American side of players on the 2022 US Darts Masters. 4 of them were PDC Tour Card holders from North America, and the other 4 came through the CDC qualifier.

The qualifiers are:

Draw

References

North American Championship
North American Championship
North American Championship
PDC